Church of the Assumption of the Blessed Virgin Mary may refer to:

Belarus
 Church of the Assumption of the Blessed Virgin Mary, Budslau
 Church of the Assumption of the Blessed Virgin Mary, Pruzhany

Bosnia and Herzegovina
 Church of the Assumption of the Blessed Virgin Mary, Uskoplje

Croatia
 Church of the Assumption of the Blessed Virgin Mary (Crikvenica)

Germany
 Church of the Assumption of the Blessed Virgin Mary, Frauenau

Lithuania
 Church of the Assumption of the Blessed Virgin Mary into Heaven, Telšiai

Poland
 Church of the Assumption of the Blessed Virgin Mary (Toruń), in the Medieval Town of Toruń
 Church of the Assumption of the Blessed Virgin Mary (Tuczno)

Russia
 Church of the Assumption of the Blessed Virgin Mary (Trinity-Lykov)

United Kingdom
 Church of the Assumption of the Blessed Virgin Mary, Hartwell, Buckinghamshire, England
 Church of the Assumption of the Blessed Virgin Mary, Redenhall, Norfolk, England

United States
 Church of the Assumption of the Blessed Virgin Mary (Plattenville, Louisiana)
 Church of the Assumption of the Blessed Virgin Mary (Washington, D.C.)